Giovanni Kean Dossè (born 25 July 1993) is an Italian professional footballer who plays as a striker for Sanmarinese club Pennarossa.

Early and personal life
Kean was born in Vercelli to Ivorian parents Biorou and Isabelle. His younger brother, Moise, is also a footballer.

Career
Kean played for Pro Vercelli, Asti, Savona, Vado, Acqui, Giulianova, Finale, PDHA, Roccella and Sancataldese, making over 40 appearances in Serie D, before going professional with Serie C club Rieti in July 2018. He was released from his Rieti contract by mutual consent on 29 January 2019. Kean remained without club until December 2019, where he joined Serie D club Castrovillari. In December 2020 he signed for Eccellenza amateurs Termoli. He left Termoli by the end of the season.

In July 2021 he was announced as a new player of Sanmarinese club Pennarossa.

References

1993 births
Living people
Italian footballers
Italian people of Ivorian descent
Italian sportspeople of African descent
F.C. Pro Vercelli 1892 players
Asti Calcio F.C. players
Savona F.B.C. players
F.C. Vado players
Acqui U.S. 1911 players
A.S.D. Città di Giulianova 1924 players
A.S.D. Roccella players
F.C. Rieti players
U.S. Castrovillari Calcio players
A.S.D. Termoli Calcio 1920 players
Serie D players
Serie C players
Association football forwards
People from Vercelli
S.S. Pennarossa players
Footballers from Piedmont
Sportspeople from the Province of Vercelli